UCSI University, Sarawak Campus is a branch of the UCSI University private university located in Sarawak, Malaysia that houses the Faculty of Hospitality & Management, Faculty of Business & Information Science and Centre for Pre-U Studies. The campus hosts a student population of over 500.

History
UCSI University was established in 1986. Originally the Canadian Institute of Computer Studies, the school has evolved with accreditation. In 1990, it became Sedaya College, later Sedaya International College. In 2003 it became University College Sedaya International (UCSI), and in 2008 when it became a full university was renamed UCSI University. UCSI University has three (3) campuses, namely KL Campus, Sarawak Campus and Terengganu Campus.

UCSI University Sarawak Campus, situated in Kuching, Sarawak, this Campus provides a dynamic and stimulating environment in which to study hospitality, tourism, events management, retailing, industrial relations and international business. The Sarawak Campus is strongly linked with the industry's best such as Marina Bay Sands Singapore, Hard Rock Hotel, Bolton Hotel in New Zealand, Hokkaido Tracks Resort Properties in Japan, and Resort Worldwide, the Borneo Convention Centre Kuching, the Sarawak Tourism Board and many more. This ensures that courses run remain highly relevant to today's demands in the hospitality industry to allow for the development of skills that guarantee these graduates worldwide employment.

UCSI University Sarawak Campus housed 3 major faculties. There are Faculty of Hospitality and Tourism, Faculty of Business and Information Science and Centre for Pre-U Studies.

In support of the state's rapidly developing hospitality and tourism industry, UCSI University Kuching's own expansion plans are already underway to build a campus and hotel at the mega Kuching Isthmus development site. The UCSI Education Precinct and the UCSI City Island Hotel will be built on 25.5 acres of land, all within the vicinity of the famed Borneo Convention Centre.

Co-Operative Education Training Programme
UCSI's Co-Operative Education Training Programme, established in 2004, collaborates with over 700 employer organisations to provide work experience to students during their years of education. For each year at UCSI, students work for at least two months. The university also hooks up the students with many organisations in the hospitality and tourism industry for part-time stints.

UCSI University, Sarawak Campus Co-Op Partners:

JAPAN
 Hokkaido Tracks Resort Niseko
 Ki Niseko

NEW ZEALAND
 Bolton Hotel
 Kingsgate Hotel

MACAU
 Galaxy Hotel, Macau

BANGKOK
 Pacific Asia Travel Association

MALDIVES
 Jumeirah Vittaveli

MALAWI
 Sunbird Capital Hotel

SINGAPORE
 Marina Bay Sands
 Universal Studio 
 Grand Hyatt Hotel
 Wyndham Group Hotel
 Rendezvous Grand Hotel
 Marina Mandarin
 Santa Grand Hotel
 Ascott Hotel
 Conrad Centennial
 Swissotel
 Movenpick Hotel & Singapore Hotel
 Sheraton Towers Singapore Hotel
 Scarlet Hotel
 Changi Travel Service Pte. Ltd
 IE Ideas Pte Ltd

MALAYSIA
 Traders Hotel
 Hard Rock Hotel
 Berjaya Hotel & Resort
 Price Hotel & Residence
 Concorde Hotel
 Concorde Inn
 Hilton Hotel
 Hyatt Regency
 Majestic Hotel
 Shangri-La Hotel
 Sunway Lagoon
 Genting Theme Park
 LEGOLAND
 Hotel Jen Puteri Harbour
 Berjaya Langkawi Resort
 The Danna Lankawi
 Casa del Mar Langkawi
 Lake House Cameron Highland
 Hard Rock Hotel
 Copthorne Orchid Penang 
 Copthorne Orchid Cameron Highland
 Sutera Sanctuary Hotel Kota Kinabalu
 Promenade Hotel
 Ballonyco Kota Kinabalu
 Sutera Harbour 
 Pullman Hotel
 Merdeka Palace Hotel & Suites
 Grand Margherita
 Riverside Majestic Hotel
 Four Points by Sheraton
 360 Urban Resort Hotel
 Damai Beach Resort
 Damai Puri Resort & Spa
 Permai Rainforest Resort
 Sukau Rainforest Resort
 Boulevard Hypermarket
 Borneo Convention Centre Kuching
 Sarawak Convention Bureau
 Sarawak Tourism Board
 Sarawak Club
 Borneo Eco Tours
 Galileo by Travelport
 Cat City Holiday
 Planet Borneo
 Event Horizon
 BEAM Event
 Paramount Hotel
 Daesco Sibu
 Royal Mulu Hotel
 and many more ...

Academic programmes
UCSI University, Sarawak Campus houses one faculty:
Faculty of Hospitality & Management - it is the only institution in Sarawak to offer its own fully home-grown Hospitality Management degree programme.

Programmes offered are as follows:

FACULTY OF HOSPITALITY & TOURISM MANAGEMENT
 Diploma in Hotel Management
 Diploma in Culinary Arts
 Diploma in Leisure Management
 BA (Hons) Hospitality Management
 BA (Hons) Event & Tourism Management
 BA (Hons) Commerce

FACULTY OF BUSINESS & INFORMATION SCIENCE
 Diploma in International Business
 BComm (Hons) Accounting & Finance
 BComm (Hons) Marketing

CENTRE FOR PRE-U STUDIES
 Foundation in Science 
 Foundation in Arts

Partner universities 
Australia 
 Curtin University of Technology
 Deakin University
 University of Melbourne
 University of Queensland
 Queensland University of Technology
 University of South Australia
 RMIT University

United Kingdom 
 Middlesex University
 Northumbria University
 University of Central Lancashire
 University of Hertfordshire
 University of Portsmouth
 University of the West of England, Bristol
 University of Northampton
 University of South Wales
 University of Huddersfield

Ireland 
 Cork Institute of Technology
 Dublin Business School
 Dublin Institute of Technology
 Galway-Mayo Institute of Technology
 Griffith College
 Institute of Technology Carlow
 University College Cork
 University of Limerick
 Waterford Institute of Technology
 Maynooth University

Canada  
 University of Manitoba

Poland 
 Kozminski University

New Zealand
 Auckland University of Technology
 University of Otago

See also 
 List of universities in Malaysia

References

External links 
 

Universities and colleges in Sarawak
Educational institutions established in 2008
2008 establishments in Malaysia
Private universities and colleges in Malaysia